Typhlatya monae is a species of basket shrimp in the family Atyidae. It is found in the Caribbean and Africa.

The IUCN conservation status of Typhlatya monae is "LC", least concern, with no immediate threat to the species' survival. The IUCN status was reviewed in 2013.

References

Further reading

 

Atyidae
Articles created by Qbugbot
Crustaceans described in 1954
Arthropods of the Dominican Republic